César Arzo Amposta (born 21 January 1986) is a Spanish retired footballer who played as a central defender.

Club career
Arzo was born in Villarreal, Valencian Community. He came through the ranks of hometown club Villarreal CF, making his debut for the first team on 23 March 2003 against Real Sociedad but never being able to consolidate himself in the starting XI, however.

In the 2006–07 season, Arzo was loaned to La Liga newcomers Recreativo de Huelva alongside teammates Javier López Vallejo and Santi Cazorla, moving on loan for the following campaign to another promotee, Real Murcia. Immediately after returning from his latter loan he was deemed surplus to requirements by Villarreal boss Manuel Pellegrini, rejoining, now definitely, Recreativo on a free transfer.

Arzo returned to Villarreal in July 2009, as the club retained an option to buy back from Huelva. However, he was immediately sold, signing a four-year contract with Real Valladolid as well as former Villarreal teammate Marcos.

In summer 2011, aged 25, Arzo moved abroad, going on to represent in the following years K.A.A. Gent (Belgium), Beitar Jerusalem FC (Israel) and AEK Athens FC (Greece). This was interspersed with a five-month spell back in his country, with Real Zaragoza.

On 5 July 2016, Arzo signed a two-year contract with Kazakhstan Premier League side FC Kairat. He left by mutual agreement on 21 November 2017 and, late into the following month, he returned to his country by joining Gimnàstic de Tarragona.

Arzo suffered a knee injury in October 2018, and subsequently retired. The following March, he joined the political party Citizens, taking part of their candidacy for the Congress of Deputies.

Career statistics

Club

Honours

Club
Villarreal
UEFA Intertoto Cup: 2003, 2004

AEK
Greek Football Cup: 2015–16

Kairat
Kazakhstan Cup: 2017
Kazakhstan Super Cup: 2017

References

External links

1986 births
Living people
People from Villarreal
Sportspeople from the Province of Castellón
Spanish footballers
Footballers from the Valencian Community
Association football defenders
La Liga players
Segunda División players
Divisiones Regionales de Fútbol players
Villarreal CF B players
Villarreal CF players
Recreativo de Huelva players
Real Murcia players
Real Valladolid players
Real Zaragoza players
Gimnàstic de Tarragona footballers
Belgian Pro League players
K.A.A. Gent players
Israeli Premier League players
Beitar Jerusalem F.C. players
Super League Greece players
AEK Athens F.C. players
Kazakhstan Premier League players
FC Kairat players
Spain youth international footballers
Spain under-21 international footballers
Spanish expatriate footballers
Expatriate footballers in Belgium
Expatriate footballers in Israel
Expatriate footballers in Greece
Expatriate footballers in Kazakhstan
Spanish expatriate sportspeople in Belgium
Spanish expatriate sportspeople in Israel
Spanish expatriate sportspeople in Greece
Spanish expatriate sportspeople in Kazakhstan